Tsang Man Fai (born 2 August 1991) is a former Hong Kong professional footballer who played as a goalkeeper.

Club career

Rangers
Tsang Man Fai had his first appearance of professional football match on 19 February 2011, which is a Hong Kong First Division League match, Pegasus versus Fourway Rangers. He scored a goal in the penalty area of his team and assisted his teammate Makhosonke Bhengu to score the winning goal in his first professional match.

Pegasus
He was loaned to Pegasus in January 2012.

Yokohama FC Hong Kong
During summer of 2012, Tsang Man Fai joined fellow First Division club Yokohama FC Hong Kong.

South China
On 28 June 2013, Tsang joined defending champions South China after spending a season at Yokohama FC Hong Kong. He is given jersey number 1 which was previously worn by Yapp Hung Fai, who left South China and joined Chinese Super League club Guizhou Renhe.

Southern
On 6 August 2013, Tsang was loaned to fellow First Division club Southern as Yapp's transfer fell through.

Tai Po
Following South China's decision to self-relegate, Tsang found work with another HKPL club, signing a contract with Tai Po.

Eastern
On 17 July 2019, it was revealed that Tsang had agreed to move to Eastern.

International career
Tsang Man Fai was selected as a member of Hong Kong national under-19 football team in 2010 AFC U-19 Championship qualification. He has capped for 4 times at this level.

Honours

Club
Eastern
 Hong Kong Senior Shield: 2019–20
 Hong Kong FA Cup: 2019–20

Tai Po
 Hong Kong Premier League: 2018–19

References

External links
 

1991 births
Living people
Hong Kong footballers
Association football goalkeepers
TSW Pegasus FC players
Dreams Sports Club players
Fourway Athletics players
Hong Kong Rangers FC players
South China AA players
Southern District FC players
Tai Po FC players
Eastern Sports Club footballers
Hong Kong First Division League players
Hong Kong Premier League players
Footballers at the 2014 Asian Games
Asian Games competitors for Hong Kong